The 1999–2000 Football League Trophy, known as the Auto Windscreens Shield for sponsorship reasons, was the 17th staging of the Football League Trophy, a knock-out competition for English football clubs in Second and Third Division. The winners were Stoke City who beat Bristol City 2–1 in the final.

The competition began on 7 December 1999 and ended with the final on 16 April 2000 at the Wembley Stadium.

In the first round, there were two sections: North and South. In the following rounds each section gradually eliminates teams in knock-out fashion until each has a winning finalist. At this point, the two winning finalists face each other in the combined final to determine the winners of the Football League Trophy.

First round

Northern Section
The teams that given byes to the second round are Carlisle United, Chester City, Chesterfield, Lincoln City, Macclesfield Town, Oldham Athletic, Rochdale and Scunthorpe United.

Southern Section
The teams that given byes to the second round are Bristol City, Bournemouth, Bristol Rovers, Wycombe Wanderers, Brentford, Peterborough United, Exeter City and Plymouth Argyle.

Second round

Northern Section

Southern Section

Quarter-final

Northern Section

Southern Section

Semi-final

Northern Section

Southern Section

Area finals

Northern Area final

Stoke City beat Rochdale 4–1 on aggregate.

Southern Area final

Bristol City beat Exeter City 5–1 on aggregate.

Final

External links
Official website
Auto Windscreens Shield - 1999/2000
 

EFL Trophy
Tro